Reservoir High School is a medium-sized co-educational, year 7 to 12 public high school, with approximately 700 students in Reservoir, Victoria, Australia.

The school has a well established International Student Program. The program includes students from a range of countries such as China, Vietnam, Nepal, Thailand, India and Saudi Arabia.

Reservoir High School is one of a select group of secondary colleges to be accredited  to offer advanced learning classes (SEAL or Select Entry Accelerated Learning).

In 2021, Reservoir High was recognised by the Age newspaper as a 'School that Excels' due to the continued improvement of its students' achievements and excellent results in the Victorian Certificate of Education. The school's improving achievement is based on a culture of respect and firm discipline, underpinned by  strengths based restorative practices and strong focus on the straightforward 'Gradual Release Model' of teaching.

Reservoir High has undergone a renewal of its teaching spaces and grounds. This includes the construction of a 250 seat Performing Arts Centre, a new Senior School building, 5 external competition grade netball courts (as well as the 4 internal courts as part of the joint use agreement on the Darebin Sports Stadium) and added in 2022 a new Visual Arts and Technology building. The facilities support all students to achieve at their best in a wide range of pathway programs which are designed to promote the passions, talents and interests of a diverse variety of
students.

See also
List of schools in Victoria
Victorian Certificate of Education

References

External links
Official website

Secondary schools in Melbourne
Buildings and structures in the City of Darebin
1958 establishments in Australia
Educational institutions established in 1958